Health City Cayman Islands is a JCI accredited tertiary care hospital in the Cayman Islands, a British Overseas Territory.

Background 
Dr. Devi Shetty founded Health City Cayman Islands.

History 
The 107,000 square foot facility, opened in February 2014, becoming the first advanced medical facility and tertiary care hospital in the Cayman Islands.

Facility and Current Operations 
The 104-bed tertiary care hospital features a reinforced roof, walls, doors and windows and was built to withstand the rigors of a Category 5 Hurricane and shield all of its critical assets from flooding.

Location and Satellite Offices 
The tertiary care hospital is located on 1283 Sea View Road, near High Rock in the East End District of Grand Cayman.

In 2016, Health City opened a Canadian satellite office located in Hamilton, Ontario.

Sustainability and Conservation Efforts 
In 2015, Health City's sustainability efforts resulted in 3.6 million gallons of water saved and 2.7 million gallons of sewage effluent was diverted from ground disposal. A waste reduction and landfill diversion initiative, which included recycling and onsite medical waste treatment, was also introduced and yielded a result of 60% of total waste being diverted from landfills. In terms of electricity conservation, the Caribbean hospital's infrastructure includes a building management monitoring system, as well as an HVAC (heating, ventilation and air conditioning) system diversification. The official conservation report showed that energy savings for 2015 were over 2 million Kwh saved, just under 145,000 gallons of diesel saved and 3.5 million pounds of carbon saved.

Technology 
According to Robert Pearl, executive director and CEO of the Permanente Medical Group, the largest integrated healthcare system in the U.S., Health City is bringing together the "healthcare service of Bangalore and the technology of Silicon Valley."

Future Expansion and Additions 
Plans for expansion and additions to the Health City compound include an academic institution and biotech research facility.

References

External links 

 

Medical tourism
Hospitals in the Cayman Islands
Health in the Cayman Islands
Hospitals established in 2014